Nour Heikal (born 29 September 2003 in Alexandria) is an Egyptian professional squash player. As of August 2021, she was ranked number 157 in the world.

References

2003 births
Living people
Egyptian female squash players
Sportspeople from Alexandria
21st-century Egyptian women